The Madrid−Burgos railway also known as Madrid−Aranda−Burgos railway is a railway connecting Madrid and Burgos via the  and Aranda de Duero in Iberian gauge.

It consists of a 25 km-long double-track electrified stretch from Madrid to Colmenar Viejo (used by Cercanías services) and a single-track non-electrified segment beyond Colmenar Viejo.

Upon a March 2011 landslide in the Somosierra Tunnel, the 159 km-long stretch from Colmenar Viejo to Aranda de Duero has been left abandoned. The 96 km-long stretch from Aranda to the new Burgos Railway Variant has been used for freight transport.

References 

Railway lines in Spain